Genevieve Felice Visich October 18, 1926 - May 7, 2012) played for the Rockford Peaches of the All-American Girls Professional Baseball League in 1948. She was an ambidextrous utility player.

She was a 10 time undefeated champion on Blockbusters in 1981, and won one more game on that show's finale in 1982.

References

1926 births
2012 deaths
All-American Girls Professional Baseball League players
Sportspeople from Mount Vernon, New York
21st-century American women
Jeopardy! contestants